New Hall is a 17th-century cottage in Woodford, in the Metropolitan Borough of Stockport, Greater Manchester, England. Above the door, there is a Tudor-arched lintel with the date '1630' along with the initials 'WDED' (William and Elizabeth Davenport) and the family shield. The another branch of the  Davenport family owned Bramall Hall in Bramhall, close by. The cottage, along with the adjoining farmhouse is a Grade II* listed building.

See also

Grade II* listed buildings in Greater Manchester
Listed buildings in Hazel Grove and Bramhall

References

Houses completed in 1630
Houses in Greater Manchester
Grade II* listed buildings in Greater Manchester
Buildings and structures in the Metropolitan Borough of Stockport
1630 establishments in England